Lisbon is a census-designated place (CDP) in the town of Lisbon, Androscoggin County, Maine, United States. It is one of the two main villages in the town, the other being Lisbon Falls. Lisbon village is in the western half of the town of Lisbon and is located on the Sabattus River, a south-flowing tributary of the Androscoggin River. Maine State Route 196 passes through the village, leading southeast  to Lisbon Falls and northwest  to Lewiston. The small village of Lisbon Center is in the southeast part of the CDP.

Lisbon was first listed as a CDP prior to the 2020 census.

Demographics

References 

Census-designated places in Androscoggin County, Maine
Census-designated places in Maine
Lisbon, Maine